was a private women's junior college in Osaka, Osaka, Japan. The precursor of the school was founded in 1937, and it was chartered as a university in 1966. Closed down in 2015

External links 
 Official website 

Private universities and colleges in Japan
Educational institutions established in 1937
Japanese junior colleges
Universities and colleges in Osaka Prefecture
1937 establishments in Japan